Andrew or Andy Carter may refer to:

 Andrew Carter (composer) (born 1939), English composer
 Andrew L. Carter Jr. (born 1969), US district court judge
 Andy Carter (athlete) (born 1949), British middle-distance runner
 Andy Carter (baseball) (born 1968), American baseball pitcher
 Andy Carter (cricketer) (born 1988), English cricketer
 Andy Carter (politician) (born 1974), British Conservative Party politician
 Andrew P. Carter, British structural biologist
 Sergeant Andrew Carter, a character from the TV show Hogan's Heroes